Sande may refer to:

Places

Norway
 Sande, Agder, a village in Farsund municipality in Agder county
 Sande, Møre og Romsdal, a municipality in Møre og Romsdal county
 Sande, Vestfold, a former municipality in the old Vestfold county
 Sande, Vestland, village in Sunnfjord municipality in Vestland county
 Sande Church (disambiguation)
 Sande Station, a railway station in Holmestrand municipality in Vestfold og Telemark county

Other places
 Sande, Angola
 Sande, Lower Saxony, Germany
 Sande, Paderborn, North Rhine-Westphalia, Germany

People
 Arne Sande, Danish boxer
 Chris Sande, Kenyan boxer
 Daniel Sande, Argentine fencer
 Earl Sande, American jockey
 Emeli Sandé, Scottish singer
 Erling Sande, Norwegian politician
 Hans Sande, Norwegian psychiatrist, poet, and writer
 Jakob Sande, Norwegian poet and songwriter
 Merle Sande, American infectious-disease expert
 Walter Sande, American actor

Other
 Sande society, a women's society of Liberia, Sierra Leone and Guinea

See also
 Sand (disambiguation)
 Enge-Sande, Schleswig-Holstein, Germany
 Van de Sande, a surname